The Northeast Project, which is short for the Serial Research Project on the History and Current State of the Northeast Borderland, was a five-year research project on the history and current situation of the frontiers of Northeast China which lasted from 2002 to 2007. It was launched by the Chinese Academy of Social Science (CASS) and received financial support from both the Chinese government and the CASS.

The stated purpose of the Northeast Project was to use authoritative academic research to restore historical facts and protect the stability of Northeast China—a region sometimes known as Manchuria—in the context of the strategic changes that have taken place in Northeast Asia since China's "Reform and Opening" started in 1978. Two of the project's leaders accused some foreign scholars and institutions of rewriting history to demand territory from China or to promote instability in the frontier regions, hence the necessity of the Project.

The Project has been criticized for applying the contemporary vision of China as a "unified multiethnic state" to ancient ethnic groups, states and history of the region of Manchuria and northern Korea. According to this idea, there was a greater Chinese state in the ancient past. Accordingly, any pre-modern people or state that occupied any part of what is now the People's Republic of China is defined as having been part of Chinese history. Similar projects have been conducted on Tibet and Xinjiang, which have been named Southwest Project and Northwest Project, respectively.

Due to its claims regarding Gojoseon, Goguryeo and Balhae, the project sparked disputes with South Korea. In 2004, this dispute threatened to lead to diplomatic disputes between the People's Republic of China and South Korea, although all governments involved seem to exhibit no desire to see the issue damage relations.

The Northeast Project advocated that Goguryeo and other Northeast ethnic groups belonged to the local minority, non-Han, ethnic regime in ancient China.
The Northeast Project argued that there is no relationship between Goguryo and the Goryeo regime.
The Northeast Project argued that there is no relationship between Goguryo and the current North Korean regime.
The Tohoku Project argued that there is no relationship between Goguryo and the current Korean regime.
The Northeast Project argued that the main part of Goguryo has been integrated into the Chinese  nation (Han and minority nationalities, and its branches may be integrated into the current Korean nation.

Organization
The Northeast Project was approved in 2001. Its first organizational meeting was held in Changchun (Jilin province) in June 2001 between representatives of the Chinese Academy of Social Science (CASS) and delegates from the Politburo of the Communist Party of Jilin Province, but the five-year project officially began in February 2002. The "Second Academic Conference on the History and Current State of the Northeast and on Goguryeo" (第二届东北边疆历史与现状暨高句丽学术研讨会) was held in Changchun in July 2002, organized by the "Research Center for Chinese Borderland History and Geography" (中国边疆史地研究中心; part of the CASS) and the Jilin Academy of Social Sciences, and supported by ten more academic institutions from the Northeast Chinese provinces of Jilin, Heilongjiang, and Liaoning.

Two articles unrelated to the Northeast Project claim that the Project had a budget of "an astounding 20 billion yuan" (3.21 billion US dollars), or about "three trillion Korean won."

Background
In 1982 the PRC constitution was amended to redefine the People's Republic of China as a "unitary multinational state built up jointly by the people of all its nationalities" (中华人民共和国是全国各族人民共同缔造的统一的多民族国家). Inspired by such concepts, in the 1990s some Chinese historians such as Sun Jinji 孫進己 and Zhang Boquan 張博泉 began to re-identify Goguryeo, especially the first half of Goguryeo's history before it moved its capital to the Korean peninsula, as part of the history of China rather than Korea. As early as 1993, the leader of a North Korean delegation attending a historical conference on Goguryeo in China accused Chinese historians of understanding ancient China as coterminous with the PRC, a view he claimed was not backed up by historical evidence. In 2002, the PRC government took the North Korea delegation leader's challenge and initiated the Northeast Project.

China asserted that Goguryeo was an ethnic Tungusic state; and in modern-day China, Tungusic ethnicities like Manchus are citizens of China and viewed as part of China's multi-ethnic historical civilization.

The Northeast Project is part of a series of historical research projects conducted by the Chinese Academy of Social Science, preceded by the Origin of Chinese Civilization Project and Xia–Shang–Zhou Chronology Project. These projects and other subsequent ones such as the Northeast Project are based on the modern idea of Zhonghua Minzu or a "unified multi-ethnic state", which conceives ancient China in terms of the territorial bounds of the modern Chinese state. This has led to numerous historical research projects by the Chinese Academy of Social Sciences on areas near the Chinese border, where historical territory overlaps with contemporary neighbors. This includes Manchuria and the Korean peninsula, which comprise the contemporary territories of the Democratic People's Republic of Korea, People's Republic of China, the Republic of Korea, and the Russian Federation (Siberia).

The Northeast Project consists of research on historical kingdoms, polities and ethnicities in this area, and also modern issues such as territorial disputes and immigration. Pre-modern historical kingdoms and polities covered in the Northeast Project are in chronological order: Gojoseon, Buyeo, Goguryeo, Baekjae, Balhae, Yuan dynasty, Ming dynasty, Joseon and Qing dynasty. Modern historical and contemporary states covered by the Northeast Project are the Empire of Japan, the Soviet Union, South and North Korea and the PRC. Research in the Northeast Project has claimed Gojoseon, Bueyo, Goguryeo and Balhae as regional governments of the ancient Chinese empire. This contrasts with other historiography, where these kingdoms are considered to be sovereign independent states in Korean history.

Reactions

The Northeast Project's claims on ancient kingdoms that most Koreans consider as part of their own history began to receive wide press coverage in South Korea in 2004, which led to public outrage. The Northeast Project has also received strong criticism from academic experts from South Korea and many other countries including China itself. Controversy mainly focused on Goguryeo, which continues to play a central role in Korean nationalism. The Northeast Project's appropriation of Goguryeo has become a turning point in public perception of China in South Korea and also affected strategic and diplomatic relations between the two countries. In South Korea, the Northeast Project has come to symbolize China's historical revisionism and radical political expansionism and continues to be mentioned even well after the Project was officially concluded in 2007.

However, there are lingering doubts as to whether the Northeast Project is truly finished. According to some Korean scholars, the termination of the Northeast Project is still debatable.
Local governments of the Dungbei region are still carrying out the project's legacy with the central government's approval, with signs and pamphlets in many tourist sites that introduce Goguryeo as a local government of a Chinese minority group.
2001-2008 Origin of Chinese Civilization Project (Chinese: 中華文明探源工程) is also argued to be a continuation the Northeast Project, attempting to define the Liao River civilization as the roots of Chinese ancient civilization, instead of well-known the Yellow River civilization. It is deemed controversial as the Liao River civilization include the representative Hongshan Culture (Chinese: 红山文化). The Chinese historians have first regarded the Hongshan Culture to be related with Balhae and other Korean cultures, but this project's attempts at including the Hongshan Culture as the source of Chinese ancient history sparked debate with the Korean claims and its sources based on Gojoseon.
Chinese history education that changed after 2001 History Curriculum Standards, a governmental policy overseeing Chinese history education, have drastically reduced discussion regarding history in the Korean peninsula. Korean scholars make note of the fact that, under the policy of History Program that precede the 2001 History Curriculum Standards, books included historical record that the Sui dynasty invasion of Goguryeo ended in failure and has contributed to the downfall of the Sui dynasty, but now has been deleted. Balhae has also been recorded as one of the local governments of the Tang dynasty, which remains a controversial topic in the Northeast Asian academia.
The Chinese government's attempts at extending the total length of Great Wall of China, including the Balhae and Goguryeo castle walls, are also interpreted as a continuation of the Northeast Project. While Shanhaiguan (Chinese: 山海關) were confirmed as the east end of the Great Wall before the project, the extension to Heilongjiang (Chinese: 黑龍江省) included Goguryeo and Balhae's territory, which became another source of controversy. The Great Wall of China had been extended again in 2012, exceeding almost twice the original length of the Great Wall. Korean scholars have strongly protested against the repeated alteration of historical details published by the Chinese government. Korean scholars also protest that historical artifacts chiefly in Goguryeo and Balhae territory are being destroyed.

Legacy
After the Northeast Project came under strong criticism in 2004, key members of the Northeast Project, along with other academics in Northeast China, founded the journal History and Geography of Northeast China, published by the Jilin Academy of Social Sciences. The journal continued most research formerly conducted by the Northeast Project, and further expanded its research scope to include the historical kingdoms and polities of Lelang Commandery and Silla, both located in the Korean peninsula.

List of research topics
General History of Heilongjiang
Cultural Research Topics of 20th Century Chinese Northeast Borderland
1580 Years of the Gwanggaeto Stele
History of Economic Relationship Between Chinese Northeast and Russia (USSR) from mid-17th century to 1949
History of Balhae
Jizi and Gija Joseon Research
Research on Russian Oriental Migration and Development
Historical Theories of Balhae
History of the Development of Ancient Peoples in Northeastern China
Research and Theory on Related Family Names of China and Korea
Research on Borderland Policies of Northeastern Region during Republican Era
Issues of Recent International Migration in Chinese Northeastern Region
Research on Northeastern Policies of Various Chinese Dynasties in History
Issues Regarding International Law and China-North Korea Border Disputes
Detailed Analysis and Research of Samguk Sagi
Research Topics Regarding Han Chinese Demographic History in the Northeast
Research on Governing of Balhae Immigrants
Research on the Restriction and Development of Yalu-river-region during the Qing Dynasty

Publications
The publications of the Northeast Project include at least the following books, which were all published in the "Northeast Borderland Research" (东北边疆研究) series of the Chinese Academy of Social Sciences Press. All titles are in Chinese.
Geng Tiehua 耿铁华. One Thousand Five Hundred Eighty Years of the Gwanggaeto Stele 好太王碑一千五百八十年祭 (2003).
Li Dalong 李大龙. Research on the Dependency System in the Han and Tang Dynasties 汉唐藩属体制研究 (2006). .
Li Deshan 李德山 and Luan Fan 栾凡. History of the Development of Ancient Nationalities in China's Northeast 中国东北古民族发展史 (2003). .
Ma Dazheng 马大正 (editor in chief). Research on China's Northeast Borderlands 中国东北边疆研究 (2003). .
Ma Dazheng 马大正, Li Dalong 李大龙, Geng Tiehua 耿铁华, and Quan Hexiu 权赫秀. More on the History of Ancient China's Gaogouli 古代中国高句丽历史续论 (2003).
Wang Xiaoju 王晓菊. Research on Immigration Development in Eastern Russia, 1861–1917　俄国东部移民开发问题研究 (2003). .
Wei Guozhong 魏国忠, Zhu Guochen 朱国忱, and Hao Qingyun 郝庆云. History of the Bohai State 渤海国史 (2006). .
Yang Jun 杨军 (editor in chief). Emergence and Transformation of the Gaogouli Nationality and State 高句丽民族与国家的形成和演变 (2006). .
Zhang Fengming 张凤鸣. History of Economic Relations Between China's Northeast and Russia (Soviet Union) 中国东北与俄国(苏联)经济关系史 (2003). .
Zheng Yongzhen 郑永振, Li Donghui 李东辉, and Yin Xuanzhe 尹铉哲. Historical Theories on Bohai 渤海史论 (2003). .

See also
History of Korea
History of China
China–South Korea relations

Notes

Works cited

.
. 23 pages, unpaginated.
.
.
.
.
.
.
.
.
.
.

External links
China ups ante in ancient-kingdom feud with Korea
Tussle over a vanished kingdom
북방고대사(北邦古代史) 논쟁

China–South Korea relations
History of Korea
History of Manchuria